Alexander Vinnik is a Russian computer expert. From 2011 to 2017, he worked at BTC-e, a Russian cryptocurrency exchange.

BTC-e

Vinnik is alleged to have directed and supervised the operations and finances of the BTC-e cryptocurrency exchange from 2011 to 2017.

In 2020 the London-based cryptocurrency analysis firm, Elliptic, believes that BTC-e may have been used by Fancy Bear during the 2015–2016 Democratic National Committee cyber attacks.

BTC-e assets were ultimately acquired by Konstantin Malofeev under control of FSB.

Arrest
On July 25, 2017, Vinnik was arrested in Greece at the request of the U.S. on suspicion of laundering $4 billion through BTC-e. Vinnik has denied the charges.

In late July 2017, the U.S. requested Vinnik's extradition from Greece.
In early October 2017, his extradition was requested by the Prosecutor General of Russia.
In late June 2018, France requested his extradition, accusing him of fraud.
In early July 2018, Russia submitted a new extradition request, reportedly based on a confession to additional hacking offenses.

In November 2018, Vinnik went on a three-month hunger strike in protest of his detainment in Greece.

In January 2020, Vinnik was extradited to France.
In June 2020, New Zealand Police announced the seizure of $90 million from WME Capital Management, a company in New Zealand registered to Vinnik.

On August 5th, 2022 the United States Justice Department released a statement saying he made his first appearance that morning for the 21-count superseding indictment from January 2017. The federal court he appeared at was in San Francisco, CA.

Sentencing
In December 2020, Vinnik was acquitted on involvement with the Locky ransomware charges, but was sentenced to five years in prison for money laundering.

U.S. Extradition
On August 4, 2022, Vinnik was extradited from Greece to the United States to face charges of money laundering and operation of an unlicensed money service business in the US.

References

Living people
People associated with Bitcoin
People from Kurgan, Kurgan Oblast
Russian businesspeople in information technology
Year of birth missing (living people)